Plunkett is an Irish surname derived from the Gaelic Ó Pluingceid. It is associated with Ireland, and possibly of Norse or Norman origin; it may be spelled O'Plunket, Plunket, Plunkit, Plunkitt, Plonkit, Plonkitt, Plonket, Plonkett, or Ó Plunceid, and may refer to:

Middle Ages
 Richard Plunkett (1340–1393), Lord Chancellor of Ireland, ancestor of the Barons of Dunsany, Barons of Killeen, and Earls of Fingall

Dunsany family
 Christopher Plunkett, 1st Baron of Dunsany (1410–1463) and uncle of the 1st Baron of Killeen
 Thomas Fitz-Christopher Plunket (c.1407-1471), Lord Chief Justice of Ireland, brother of the 1st Baron of Dunsany and uncle of the 1st Baron of Killeen
 Sir Thomas Plunket (1440 - 1519), Chief Justice of the Common Pleas for Ireland, nephew of the 1st Baron of Dunsany and 1st cousin of the 1st Baron of Killeen
 Sir Horace Curzon Plunkett (1854–1932), Irish unionist and agricultural reformer, son of the 16th Baron of Dunsany
 John William Plunkett, 17th Baron of Dunsany (1853–1899)
 Reginald Plunkett (1880–1967), a British admiral, sometimes called Reginald Aylmer Ranfurly Plunkett-Ernle-Erle-Drax or Reginald Drax, son of the 17th Baron of Dunsany
 Edward Plunkett, 18th Baron of Dunsany (1878–1957), an Anglo-Irish writer.  His pen name was Lord Dunsany
 Edward John Carlos Plunkett, 20th Baron of Dunsany (1939–2011)
 Randal Plunkett, 21st Baron of Dunsany (1983-)

Killeen and Fingall family
 Christopher Plunket, 1st Baron Killeen (d. 1445)
 Luke Plunkett, 10th Baron Killeen, 1st Earl of Fingall (d. 1637)
 Christopher Plunkett, 2nd Earl of Fingall (d. 1649)
 Arthur James Plunkett, 8th Earl of Fingall (1759–1836)
 Arthur James Plunkett, 9th Earl of Fingall (1791–1869)
 Saint Oliver Plunkett (1625–1681), Roman Catholic Archbishop of Armagh and martyr, 1st cousin of Luke Plunkett
 Sir Nicholas Plunkett (1602–1680), Irish confederate
 Sir Francis Richard Plunkett (1835–1907), British diplomat

Family of George Noble Plunkett
Distant cousins of the families of Dunsany, Killeen, and Fingall
 George Noble Plunkett (1851–1948), Irish republican and papal count
 Joseph Mary Plunkett (1887–1916), Irish republican, son of George Noble Plunkett
Geraldine "Gerry" (Plunkett) Dillon (1891-1986), daughter of George Noble Plunkett
 George Oliver Plunkett (1894–1944), Irish republican, son of George Noble Plunkett
Fiona Plunkett (1896 - 1977), daughter of George Noble Plunkett

Family of Lord Plunket
A title in the Peerage of the United Kingdom
 William Conyngham Plunket, 1st Baron Plunket (1764–1854), Lord Chancellor of Ireland, Whig MP for Dublin University
 Thomas Span Plunket, 2nd Baron Plunket (1792–1866), Bishop of Tuam, Killala and Achon
 John Span Plunket, 3rd Baron Plunket QC (1793–1871)
 Katherine Plunket (1820–1932), the oldest person ever to be born and die in Ireland, daughter of Thomas Span Plunket
Frederica Louise Edith Plunket (1838 - 1886),  daughter of Thomas Span Plunket
 William Conyngham Plunket, 4th Baron Plunket (1828–1897), Church of Ireland Bishop of Meath and later Archbishop of Dublin
 David Plunket, 1st Baron Rathmore QC (1838–1919), Conservative MP for Dublin University, son of John Span Plunket
 William Lee Plunket, 5th Baron Plunket (1864–1920), Governor General of New Zealand
 Terence Conyngham Plunket, 6th Baron Plunket (1899–1938)
 Patrick Terence William Span Plunket, 7th Baron Plunket (1923–1975), Equerry to King George IV and later Deputy Master of the Household to Queen Elizabeth II
 Robin Rathmore Plunket, 8th Baron Plunket (1925–2013), supporter and advocate of Zimbabwean Independence and racial harmony 
 Tyrone Shaun Terence Plunket, 9th Baron Plunket (born 1966), Page of Honour to HM Queen Elizabeth II

Baron Louth family
 Oliver Plunkett, 1st Baron Louth (second creation) (d. 1555)

Others
 Adam Plunkett (1903–1992), Scottish footballer
 Catherine Plunkett (born c 1725), eighteenth century Irish violinist
 Charles Peshall Plunkett (1864–1931), US rear admiral
 George Thomas Plunkett, Bishop of Elphin from 1814 to 1827
 George Washington Plunkitt (1842–1924), a New York state senator
 Jim Plunkett, an NFL quarterback
 James Plunkett, pen name of James Plunkett Kelly (1920–2003), an Irish writer
 John Plunket (1664–1738), an Irish Jacobite
 John Plunkett, (1802-1869), Attorney-General of New South Wales
 Liam Plunkett, an English cricketer
  Oliver Plunkett (1884 – 1971) was  Chief Justice of Saint Lucia and later a British judge in Palestine and Egypt, 
 Paul Edward Plunkett (1935–2018), American judge
 Peg Plunkett (1727–1797) was a brothel keeper in Dublin
 Richard Plunkett (1788–1832), Beadle or night-constable of Whitechapel, London 
 Robert Plunkett (d. 1815), President of Georgetown University
 Roy J. Plunkett (1910–1994), inventor of Teflon
 Sean Plunket, New Zealand broadcast journalist 
 Steve Plunkett, singer, guitarist and songwriter for the 1980s band Autograph
 Thomas Plunket, an Irish rifleman in the British 95th Regiment of Foot circa 1809
Thomas Plunkett (1840 - 1913), Member of the Queensland Legislative Assembly
 Thomas Plunkett (1841–1885), a United States Army Sergeant, who was awarded the Medal of Honor for his actions at the Battle of Fredericksburg
Thomas Flood "Tom" Plunkett (1878 - 1957), Member of the Queensland Legislative Assembly
 Walter Plunkett (1902–1982), an Academy Award-winning costume designer
 William Plunkett, an 18th-century highwayman in England and possibly later a colonel and magistrate in Pennsylvania
 William C. Plunkett (1799–1884), Lieutenant Governor for the Commonwealth of Massachusetts from 1854 to 1855

See also
 Royal New Zealand Plunket Society
Plunkett, Queensland, a neighbourhood in Australia
Plunkett railway station, in Plunkett, Queensland
 Plunket Shield, the original New Zealand first-class cricket championship
 Plunket shark or dogfish Centroscymnus plunketi or Proscymnodon plunketi
 Plunkett, Saskatchewan
 Plunketts Creek (disambiguation), multiple uses
 Plunkett & Macleane, 1999 film
 USS Plunkett (DD-431)
 Waterford railway station, in Waterford, County Waterford, Ireland.  Named "Plunkett Station" since 1966

References

Anglo-Norman Irish dynasties